The Dublin Institute of Technology (DIT) School of Electrical and Electronic Engineering (SEEE) is the largest and one of the longest established Schools of Electrical and Electronic Engineering in Ireland. It is located at the DIT Kevin Street Campus in Dublin City, as part of the College of Engineering & Built Environment (CEBE).

Overview
The DIT School of Electrical and Electronic Engineering is the largest education provider of Electrical and Electronic Engineering in Ireland in terms of programme diversity, staff and student numbers, covering a wide range of engineering disciplines including; Communications Engineering, Computer Engineering, Power Engineering, Electrical Services Engineering, Control Engineering, Energy Management and Electronic Engineering. The school includes well established research centres in areas such as photonics, energy, antennas, communications and electrical power, with research outputs in; biomedical engineering, audio engineering, sustainable design, assistive technology and health informatics.

Educational courses in technical engineering commenced at Kevin St. Dublin 8 in 1887. The school seeks accreditation for its programmes from the appropriate Irish and international professional body organisations, such as the Institution of Engineers of Ireland, offering education across the full range of third level National Framework of Qualifications (NFQ) Levels, from Level 6 to Level 10 (apprenticeships to post-doctoral degrees).

The school currently delivers 23 individual programmes to over 1,200 students and has an output of approximately 350 graduates per year.

The head of the school is Professor Michael Conlon.

Future
Electrical & Electronic Engineering is expected to be the first School from the College of Engineering and Built Environment to move to the new multibillion-euro DIT Grangegorman Campus in September 2018.

Research

The college has strong industry links, and many programmes offer placement periods in the industry, allowing students to gain valuable real-world experience. The school focuses on research with a strong emphasis on producing relevant ideas to help Irish industry compete globally. Each year SEEE research produces patents and technologies to license, this includes a successful spin-off company in the field of mobile communications. The school hosts four research centres;
 Antenna & High Frequency Research Centre (AHFR)
 Photonics Research Centre (PRC)
 Electrical Power Research Centre (EPRC)
 Communications Network Research Institute (CNRI)

The school also has two research groups – the tPOT Research Group and Energy Resource Group – as well as involvement with the Dublin Energy Lab.

DIT SEEE research is recognised internationally for its impact and quality. Researchers in the school have built strong collaborations with worldwide renowned groups in Europe, China, India, and elsewhere, allowing the school's researchers unique access to research knowledge and facilities. DIT is an accredited Cisco Networking Academy, Instructor Training Center (ITC) and Academy Support Center (ASC).

Programmes Offered

Undergraduate Programmes
Full-Time Level 8 (Honours Degree Programmes)
 BE in Electrical/Electronic Engineering (DT021) (4 years)
 BE in Computer and Communications Engineering (DT081) (3/4 years)
 BSc in Networking Applications & Services (DT080B) (Advanced Entry 1 year)
 BSc in Electrical Services and Energy Management (DT712) (Advanced Entry 1 year)
 BSc in Electrical Services and Energy Management (DT035) (4 years)

Full-Time Level 7 (Ordinary Degree Programmes)
 BTech in Networking Technologies (DT080A) (3 years)
 BEngTech in Sustainable Design in Electrical Services Engineering (DT010) (3 years)
 BEngTech in Electrical and Control Engineering (DT009) (3 years)
 BEngTech in Electronics and Communications Engineering (DT008) (3 years)

Part-Time Level 8 (Honours Degree Programmes)
 BE in Electrical/Electronic Engineering (DT073) (4 years)
 BSc in Electrical Services and Energy Management (DT018) (Advanced Entry 2 years)

Part-Time Level 7 (Ordinary Degree Programmes)
 BEngTech in Electrical and Control Engineering (DT016) (3 years)
 Bachelor Engineering Tec (Ord) Electrical Services Engineering (DT083) (Advanced Entry 2 years)

Postgraduate Programmes
Full-Time Level 9   
 MSc in Electronic and Communications Engineering (DT086) (1 year)
 Master of Science Energy Management (DT711) (1 year)

Part-Time Level 9   
 MSc in Electronic and Communications Engineering (DT085) (3 years)
 Master of Science Energy Management (DT015) (3 years)

Level 6 (Higher Certificate)
 Certificate of Attendance Programmable Logic Controllers (DT075) (3 years)
 Higher Certificate in Electrical Services Engineering (DT078) (1 year)
 Apprenticeship Electrical Update Phase 6 (DT096) (2 years)
 Higher Certificate Power Plant Technology (Plant Operations) (DT098) (2 years)
 Higher Certificate Power Plant Technology (Plant Management) (DT099) (2 years)
 Apprenticeship Electrical (SBE)

See also
 DIT School of Electronic and Communications Engineering
 Engineers Ireland
 Cisco Networking Academy

References

External links
 DIT Electrical & Electronic Engineering

Dublin Institute of Technology
Information technology management
Software engineering organizations
Cisco Systems
Science and technology in Ireland
Communications in the Republic of Ireland
Telecommunications in the Republic of Ireland
Education in Dublin (city)
Further education colleges in Dublin (city)
1887 establishments in Ireland
Educational institutions established in 1978